Humberstone is a surname. Notable people with the surname include:

Arthur Humberstone (1912-1999), British animator
Chris Humberstone (1946-1999), English automobile designer
H. Bruce Humberstone (1901–1984), American screen actor and film director
Holly Humberstone (born 1999), English singer-songwriter
James Thomas Humberstone (1850–1939), English chemical engineer
Simon Humberstone (born 1987), British rugby Union player
William Humberstone (1836–1922), Canadian politician
William Humberstone (Leicester MP), English Member of Parliament